Chilean Venezuelans are Venezuelans of Chilean descent or Chileans who have obtained Venezuelan citizenship. This migratory flow was one of the main destinations for exiles from the Pinochet dictatorship, at which time approximately 80,000 people came to Venezuela, in addition to professional migrants motivated by the oil boom occurred between 1950 and 1980.

In 2011, the Miranda State was the state with the highest concentration of Chileans (2,744 in total), followed by the Bolívar State (1,947 in total) and the Capital District (1,334 in total). Several activities are carried out within the Chilean communities of Venezuela, such as the 1973 coup d'état commemoration and the celebration of native land holidays.

Notable people

Chilean immigrants in Venezuela
Isabel Allende, writer (she lived in Venezuela between 1975 and 1988)
Jaime Castillo Velasco, lawyer and politician
Beto Cuevas, singer
Mariano Díaz, photographer

Venezuelans descendants of Chileans
George Forsyth, footballer
Gregorio González Nicolini, filmmaker and financial analyst
Jorge Valdivia, footballer

See also
 Chile–Venezuela relations
 Tarapacá migrant crisis

References

 
Ethnic groups in Venezuela
Venezuela